Railfan: Chicago Transit Authority Brown Line or just  is a train simulator for single players co-developed by Ongakukan and Taito for the PlayStation 3 system. It was released in Japan on December 20, 2006.

Train Simulator series
Railfan is a franchise among Ongakukan's popular Train Simulator series and it is followed by Actainment's Railfan: Taiwan High Speed Rail which was released in Asia in 2007.

Railfan lines
The software is based on three independent lines located in Chicago, Tokyo and Kyoto, Osaka. Series producer and Ongakukan CEO Minoru Mukaiya's team has captured each line in Full HD, including the stations which are located either in Illinois or in Japan.

JR East Chūō Main Line (Tokyo)

Available line in Tokyo is the East Japan Railway Company Chūō Main Line from the Mitaka Station to the Tokyo Station. Rolling stock is the JR201 (201系). Stations are available in the following order:
Mitaka
Kichijōji
Nishi-Ogikubo
Ogikubo
Asagaya
Kōenji
Nakano
Higashi-Nakano
Ōkubo
Shinjuku
Yoyogi
Sendagaya
Shinanomachi
Yotsuya
Iidabashi
Suidōbashi
Ochanomizu
Kanda
Tokyo

CTA Brown Line (Chicago)

The Chicago Transit Authority (CTA) Brown Line (Fullerton~The Loop~Fullerton) includes 14 stations. A 4-car CTA3200 'L' rolling stock train is available on this line. Stations are available in the following order:
Fullerton
Armitage
Sedgwick
Chicago
Merchandise Mart
Washington
Quincy
La Salle
Library
Adams
Madison
Randolph
State/Lake
Clark
Merchandise Mart
Chicago
Sedgwick
Armitage
Fullerton

KER Keihan Main Line (Kyoto, Osaka)

The Keihan Electric Railway Keihan Main Line (Sanjō~Yodoyabashi) is about 51 km. Available train is the Keian 8000 (8000系). Stations are available in the following order:

Demachiyanagi
Marutamachi
Sanjō
Shijō
Gojō
Shichijō
Tofukuji
Tobakaido
Fushimi-inari
Fukakusa
Fujinomori
Sumizome
Tambabashi
Fushimi-momoyama
Chushojima
Yodo
Yawatashi
Hashimoto
Kuzuha
Makino
Goten-yama
Hirakatashi
Hirakata-koen
Kozenji
Korien
Neyagawashi
Kayashima
Owada
Furukawabashi
Kadomashi
Nishisanso
Moriguchishi
Doi
Takii
Sembayashi
Morishoji
Sekime
Noe
Kyobashi
Temmabashi
Kitahama
Yodoyabashi

Modes
The software includes two game modes plus an extra mode dedicated to collectible content.

Mission
The Mission mode is a driving tutorial including several basic and progressive lessons such as learning how to start and stop the train and limitation and traffic signboards. These missions are specific to each train.

Train Tour
The tour mode allows to select the station to start and stop at. Once the train is stopped a station it is possible to tour the area using tourism spots.

My collection
Replay: this feature allows to watch a saved demonstration game and to take live snapshots.

Car Collection: this feature allows to get "Replay" mode unlocked train model profiles. Collection differs from a line to another.

Movie Collection: this feature allows to watch unlocked game videos including opening and ending movies.

Promotion video

A promotion video mostly consisting of behind the scenes from the Chicago production was made available on the game's official website and was later added in Sony Computer Entertainment Korea's product page.

Notes

2006 video games
Train simulation video games
PlayStation 3-only games
Chicago Transit Authority
PlayStation 3 games
Video games developed in Japan
Video games set in Chicago
Video games set in Japan
Video games set in Tokyo